K. L. Dhammajoti (born 29 May 1949) is a Buddhist monk from Kuala Lumpur, Malaysia. He was ordained according to the Theravada tradition of Buddhism. 

He is also one of the leading scholars on Sarvastivada Abhidharma. and is well known in the world of Buddhist scholarship for several contributions. These include some of his own personal work, such as Sarvastivada abhidharma, The Chinese Version of the Dhammapada, Entrance into the Supreme Doctrine, and Abhidhamma Doctrines and controversies on Perception. He is also the founding editor of an annual academic Journal of Buddhist Studies from the Centre for Buddhist Studies, Sri Lanka. Currently, he is serving as the director of Buddha-Dharma Centre of Hong Kong Ltd.

References

External links 
https://web.archive.org/web/20091230155746/http://www.buddhism.hku.hk/Publication_new.html
The writer in this link wrongly recognizes Ven. KL Dhammajoti as Sri Lankan. Except that the information contained in the article is correct. *http://www.lakehouse.lk/mihintalava/sasana02.htm
https://web.archive.org/web/20081225232301/http://ibc.ac.th/en/dhammajoti/professorship
https://web.archive.org/web/20110719235754/http://ibc.ac.th/en/dhammajoti/rector
https://web.archive.org/web/20100905124642/http://ibc.ac.th/en/dhammajoti
http://www.ucalgary.ca/numatachair/previous_chairholders

1949 births
Living people
Theravada Buddhism writers
Expatriates in Sri Lanka
Malaysian expatriates in Hong Kong
Malaysian Buddhist monks